Saheba is a 2017 Indian Kannada-language romantic action film written and directed by Bharath. It features Manoranjan Ravichandran, son of actor-director V. Ravichandran, making his debut, along with Shanvi Srivastava. Bullet Prakash, Kuri Prathap and Lakshmi play the supporting roles. The score and soundtrack for the film is by V. Harikrishna and the cinematography is by G. S. V. Seetharam.

The film was officially launched on 14 January 2016, coinciding the Sankranthi festival. The principal photography started on 18 January 2016 in Bangalore. The filming is also held at Venice, Italy. The film was released on 25 August 2017. The core plot of the movie was reported to have been inspired by the play Pygmalion and its movie version My Fair Lady.

Cast

 Manoranjan Ravichandran as Manu
 Shanvi Srivastava as Nandini
 Lakshmi
 Pramila Joshai
 Bullet Prakash
 Kuri Prathap
 Nabha Natesh special appearance in the song Yaare Ninu Roza Huve

Soundtrack

The film's score and soundtrack was composed by V. Harikrishna. The audio was released online on 27 January 2017 and the music rights were acquired by Lahari Music. The song "Yaare Neenu Roja Hoove" from the V. Ravichandran starrer Naanu Nanna Hendthi (1985) which was sung by S. P. Balasubrahmanyam was reused in the film.

References

External links
 
 

2017 films
2010s Kannada-language films
2017 romantic drama films
Indian romantic drama films
Films shot in Italy
Films scored by V. Harikrishna
2017 masala films
2017 directorial debut films